Live From Another Level is a live worship album by Israel & New Breed. It was recorded in November 2003 at the Total Grace Christian Center in Decatur, Georgia. It is Houghton's fourth album, his third on Integrity Media, and his second live recording. The album received good reviews from critics.

Track listing

Level 1 (Disc 1)
Come In From The Outside- 5:38 
Again I Say Rejoice- 4:59 
Again I Say Rejoice (Reprise)- 2:04 
We Win- 4:54 
All Around- 5:38 
You've Made Me Glad/Who Is Like The Lord?- 6:51 
I Hear The Sound- 7:39 
Spoken Word by Bishop Garlington- 2:31 
Medley: So Easy To Love You/Friend Of God- 3:49

Level 2 (Disc 2)
Friend of God- 6:34 
Spontaneous Worship- 3:10 
Friend- 6:25 
Friend Medley: Joy Of My Desire/No Not One/What A Friend We Have In Jesus- 7:12 
Rise Within Us- 5:18  
Another Breakthrough- 7:14 
Lord Of The Breakthrough- 7:36 
Breathe Into Me- 5:12 
Awesome Medley- 2:56 
Medley: Here I Am To Worship/You Are Good- 7:29 
Holy- 4:23 
Going To Another Level- 6:11

References

"All around was featured on guitar praise

Israel Houghton albums
2004 live albums